Elmore County is the name of two counties in the United States:

 Elmore County, Alabama 
 Elmore County, Idaho

See also
 Elmore County Courthouse (disambiguation)